Celso Morga Iruzubieta (born 28 January 1948 in Huércanos, La Rioja, Spain) is the current Archbishop of Mérida-Badajoz. He had previously served as Secretary of the Congregation for the Clergy, since his appointment by Pope Benedict XVI on 29 December 2010 

Iruzubieta studied at a diocesan seminary. He was ordained a priest on 24 June 1972 for the diocese of Calahorra y la Calzada in Logroño, Spain. He received his doctorate in Canon Law at the University of Navarre. He was pastor and judicial vicar in his diocese. For four years he carried out his ministry in the Archdiocese of Cordoba, Argentina as an adjunct judicial vicar and professor of Canon Law at the diocesan seminary. 

He has served in the Congregation for Clergy since 1987, and has held the posts of Head of Office (2000–09) and Under-secretary (2009–10). He was named Secretary, and Titular Archbishop of Alba Maritima on 29 December 2010. He succeeds Mauro Piacenza, who was appointed Prefect of the Congregation. Along with Archbishop Marcello Bartolucci, Secretary of the Congregation of the Causes of Saints, who was named on the same day, and Archbishop Savio Tai Fai Hon, Secretary of the Congregation for the Evangelization of Peoples, who was appointed on 23 December, he was consecrated bishop in on 5 February 2011 by Pope Benedict XVI, with Angelo Cardinal Sodano and Tarcisio Cardinal Bertone. 

On 8 October 2014 he was appointed Coadjutor Archbishop of Mérida-Badajoz by Pope Francis, and he succeeded as Archbishop on Thursday, May 21, 2015.

References

External links

Living people
1948 births
21st-century Roman Catholic archbishops in Spain
Spanish Roman Catholic titular archbishops
Members of the Congregation for the Clergy
People from La Rioja
University of Navarra alumni